John Frederick Lively (15 June 1930 – 27 October 1998) was emeritus professor of politics at the University of Warwick. He is known for his influential study of democracy (1975).

Early life and family
Jack Lively was born in Newcastle on 15 June 1930. He was educated at the Royal Grammar School, Newcastle, and then St John's College, Cambridge.

He was married to the novelist Penelope Lively.

Career
Lively was professor of politics at the University of Warwick for 14 years. He was a specialist on utilitarianism and wrote an influential study of democracy.

Death
Lively died in London on 27 October 1998.

Selected publications
 Social and Political Thought of Alexis de Tocqueville. Clarendon Press, Oxford, 1965.
 The Enlightenment. Longmans, London, 1966.
 Democracy. Blackwell, Oxford, 1975. 
 Utilitarian Logic and Politics: James Mill's "Essay on Government". Clarendon Press, Oxford. 1978. 
 Democracy in Britain: A Reader. Blackwell, Oxford, 1994. (edited with Adam Lively)

References 

British political scientists
Academics of Swansea University
Academics of the University of Warwick
People from Newcastle upon Tyne
Alumni of St John's College, Cambridge
1930 births
1998 deaths
20th-century political scientists